The Ezzelini were a noble family in medieval Italy. The family was founded by Ecelo (Ezzelo), who received the fiefs of Romano d'Ezzelino and Onara
 Ezzelino I da Romano (died 1189), called il Balbo
 Ezzelino II da Romano (died 1235), called il Monaco, son of Ezzelino I
 Ezzelino III da Romano (1194–1259), called il Tiranno, son of Ezzelino II
 Alberico da Romano (1196–1260), son of Ezzelino II
 Cunizza da Romano (born c. 1198), daughter of Ezzelino II

 
Italian noble families